François Pupponi (born 31 July 1962) is a French politician. Born in Nantua in Eastern France, he is of Corsican descent. He has served as the mayor of Sarcelles between 1997 and 2017. He also serves as a member of the National Assembly, representing Val-d'Oise's 8th constituency.

References

1962 births
Living people
French people of Corsican descent
People from Nantua
People from Sarcelles
Mayors of places in Île-de-France
Socialist Party (France) politicians
Deputies of the 14th National Assembly of the French Fifth Republic
Deputies of the 15th National Assembly of the French Fifth Republic
Politicians from Auvergne-Rhône-Alpes
Members of Parliament for Val-d'Oise